This is a complete list of Telugu Cinemalu produced by the Tollywood Telugu Cinema Industry based in Madras & Hyderabad in 1953. Movies released 28 plus Chandirani produced under Bharani Studios banner. It was directed by P. Bhanumathi released on 28 August 1953. Thus total films released during 1953 are 29.

References

External links
 Earliest Telugu language films at IMDb.com (168 to 189)

1953
Telugu
Telugu films